Pius X High School was a private, Roman Catholic high school in Bangor, Pennsylvania, in the Lehigh Valley region of eastern Pennsylvania. Part of the Roman Catholic Diocese of Allentown, it operated from 1951 to 2015.

History
Pius X was established as Our Lady of Mount Carmel High School in 1951 by the Salesian Sisters.  It was renamed after Pope Pius X in 1953, shortly after his canonization.

Due to declining enrollment, Pius X High School was forced to close its doors on June 2, 2015. At the time, the school's enrollment had dropped to just 165 students in grades 7 through 12, with the final senior class consisting of 46 students...about 27% of the student body. Students in grades 7 through 11 were forced to transfer to other nearby public or private schools following Pius X's closure.

According to a statement released by the diocese, enrollment at Pius X had declined by nearly 43 percent with estimates for the coming year projecting a further decline to 150 students. At the time of the announcement, school leaders were also anticipating that they would end the school's final fiscal year with an operating debt of $1.2 million (over and above the $1 million subsidy which had been provided by the diocese for the 2009-10 school year).

Notes and references

External links
Pius X High School official website

Educational institutions established in 1951
Catholic secondary schools in Pennsylvania
Schools in Northampton County, Pennsylvania
1951 establishments in Pennsylvania